Pediatric urology is a surgical subspecialty of medicine dealing with the disorders of children's genitourinary systems. Pediatric urologists provide care for both boys and girls ranging from birth to early adult age. The most common problems are those involving disorders of urination, reproductive organs and testes.

Focus areas
Some of the problems they deal with are: 
Bladder control problems such as bedwetting and daytime urinary incontinence
Undescended testes (cryptorchidism)
Hypospadias
 Epispadias
Urolithiasis (bladder and kidney stones)
Chordee and other minor malformations of the penis
Phimosis
Urinary obstruction and vesicoureteral reflux
Neurogenic bladder (e.g., associated with spina bifida)
 Antenatal hydronephrosis
Tumors and cancers of the kidneys
Repair of genitourinary trauma
Genitourinary malformations and birth defects
Prune belly syndrome
Cloacal exstrophy, bladder exstrophy, and epispadias
Ambiguous genitalia and intersex conditions

Pediatric urologists
In North America, most pediatric urologists are associated with children's hospitals. Training for board certification in pediatric urology typically consists of a surgery internship as part of a urology residency followed by subspecialty training in pediatric urology at a major children's hospital. In India, Pediatric Urology is practiced by Pediatric Surgeons with a special interest/ training in pediatric urology as well as by adult urologists who get trained in Pediatric Urology.

See also
Urology

References

External links
 American Urological Association pediatric pages
 Journal of Pediatric Urology

Urology, Pediatric
Urology